Benjamin H. Steele (February 8, 1837 – July 13, 1873) was an American attorney and judge.  He served as an associate justice of the Vermont Supreme Court from 1865 to 1870.

Early life
Benjamin Hinman Steele was born in Stanstead, Quebec, on February 8, 1837, the son of Sanford and Mary (Hinman) Steele.  Steele was educated at academies in Stanstead and Derby, Vermont, and was a superior student; at age 14 he began teaching, and worked at schools in Troy, Vermont, and Concord, Massachusetts.  Steele attended the College of Saint-Pierre-de-la-Rivière-du-Sud to learn French, and then attended Norwich University.

He graduated from Dartmouth College in 1857; in addition to being the class valedictorian, Steele was a member of the Psi Upsilon fraternity and the Phi Beta Kappa Society.  While at Dartmouth, Steele developed an interest in the military, and organized an informal militia company, the "Dartmouth Grays", which consisted of members of the class of 1859, including Wheelock G. Veazey and Edward Cowles.  At the start of the American Civil War, several former members of the Dartmouth Grays were able to receive commissions in the Union Army as a result of their militia experience.

Admission to the bar
After graduating from Dartmouth, Steele became the principal of an academy in Barton, Vermont, where he also began to study law with attorney John P. Sartle.  Steele interrupted his legal studies when he became ill; after recovery, he traveled to Cambridge, Massachusetts, intending to enroll at Harvard Law School.  Instead, while visiting the Massachusetts Supreme Judicial Court in 1858, Steele's friends suggested that he apply to be admitted to the bar.  He was interviewed by a committee which included Benjamin Butler; Rufus Choate, who had overheard a portion of Steele's interview, commended him on his performance.  Steele easily passed the examination, and was qualified as an attorney.

Career
After considering relocating to the western United States, Steele opted instead to begin a practice in Derby.  While practicing law, Steele also served as postmaster of Derby Line.  He later moved to St. Johnsbury, and among the prospective attorneys who studied in his office was Henry Clay Ide.

Steele's health prevented him from joining the Army during the Civil War; instead, he was appointed drillmaster on the military staff of Governor Erastus Fairbanks with the rank of colonel, and provided the initial military training to newly recruited Union Army soldiers.

In 1865, Luke P. Poland, the chief justice of the Vermont Supreme Court, was appointed to fill the vacancy in the United States Senate caused by the death of Jacob Collamer.  Associate Justice John Pierpoint succeeded Poland; despite being only 28 years old, Steele's reputation as an attorney was so well established after his seven years' experience that he was appointed to fill the vacant Associate Justice's position.  Steele served on the court until 1870, when he declined reappointment, and returned to the practice of law.  In February 1870, Governor Peter T. Washburn died; the Lieutenant Governor, George Whitman Hendee, succeeded to the governorship, and Steele was the jurist who administered the oath of office to Hendee.

In 1870, was appointed to the Vermont Board of Education, on which he served until 1873.  In 1872, Steele was an unsuccessful candidate for the United States House of Representatives; the Republican nomination, then tantamount to election, went to Poland.  Later in 1872, Steele was a delegate to the Republican National Convention.

Death and burial
Steele's health had never been robust, and he suffered from frequent bronchial infections and hemorrhages.  In 1873, his health began to severely decline, and he traveled to New York City for medical advice.  Accepting a suggestion that the western United States might provide a healthier climate, he undertook a trip to Minnesota.  His health improved for a time, but then continued to decline, and he died in Faribault on July 13, 1873.  Steele was buried at Hartland Village Cemetery in Hartland, Vermont.

Family
In 1861, Steele married Martha (Mattie) Foxcroft Sumner (1840–1896), the daughter of David and Wealthy (Thomas) Sumner of Hartland.  They were the parents of two children, daughter Mary Hinman Steele (1853–1937), and son David Sumner Steele (1871–1937).

Steele's sister Lydia (1839–1935) was the wife of Samuel Everett Pingree, who received the Medal of Honor during the American Civil War and served as Governor of Vermont.  Pingree and Steele had been classmates at Dartmouth College.  Steele's brothers, Hiram R. Steele and Sanford H. Steele, both became prominent attorneys in New York City.

Steele was also a second cousin of Harriet Hinman, the wife of Governor Josiah Grout.  Steele and Hinman were great-grandchildren of Benjamin Hinman Sr. and Helen Brown of Newport, Vermont.

References

Sources

Books

Newspapers

Internet

External links

Benjamin Hinman Steele at Vermont in the Civil War
Benjamon H. Steele Collection of Speeches at Dartmouth College Library

1837 births
1873 deaths
Dartmouth College alumni
Vermont postmasters
Vermont Republicans
U.S. state supreme court judges admitted to the practice of law by reading law
Vermont lawyers
Justices of the Vermont Supreme Court
People of Vermont in the American Civil War
American militia officers
Burials in Vermont
19th-century American judges
19th-century American lawyers